Lupus-TR-3 is a dim magnitude 17 K-type main sequence star approximately 8,950 light-years distant in the constellation of Lupus.

Planetary system
Lupus-TR-3 b is an exoplanet discovered in 2007 by personnel from the Center for Astrophysics  Harvard & Smithsonian using the transit method.  It has four-fifths the mass of Jupiter, nine-tenths the radius, and has density of 1.4 g/cm3. This planet is a typical "hot Jupiter" as it orbits at 0.0464 AU distance from the star, taking 3.9 days to orbit. It is currently the faintest ground-based detection of a transiting planet.

See also
 List of extrasolar planets
 Harvard-Smithsonian Center for Astrophysics

References

External links 
 
 

K-type main-sequence stars
Planetary systems with one confirmed planet
Planetary transit variables
Lupus (constellation)